Jack Hynes may refer to:

Jack Hynes (newscaster) (1929–2018), American newscaster based in Boston
Jack Hynes (soccer) (1920–2013), Scottish-born American soccer player

See also 
 John Hynes (disambiguation)